The World Rugby Rankings is a ranking system for national teams in rugby union, managed by World Rugby, the sport's governing body. There are separate men's and women's rankings. The teams of World Rugby's member nations are ranked based on their game results, with the most successful teams being ranked highest. A point system is used, with points being awarded on the basis of the results of World Rugby-recognized international matches. Rankings are based on the team's performance, with more recent results and more significant matches being more heavily weighted to help reflect the current competitive state of a team. The men's ranking system was introduced the month before the 2003 Rugby World Cup, with the first new rankings issued on 8 September 2003, when they were called the "IRB Rankings".

Men's rankings

Rank leaders
 World Rugby Ranking Leaders

When the system was introduced England were the top team and maintained that position following victory in the 2003 Rugby World Cup. New Zealand took the lead from 14 June 2004.

After winning the 2007 Rugby World Cup final, South Africa became the third team to achieve first place. The first two fixtures of the 2008 Tri Nations resulted in the top two teams switching places: the All Blacks regained the top spot after defeating South Africa in the Tri-Nations opener on 5 July 2008 in Wellington; a week later the Springboks returned the favour in Dunedin, scoring their first win over the All Blacks in New Zealand since 1998, reclaiming the top spot, only for the All Blacks to defeat both Australia and South Africa in August 2008 to regain the top spot by a considerable margin. South Africa regained the lead in July 2009 after beating New Zealand in Bloemfontein and kept the lead until losing to France in November of that year, allowing the All Blacks to regain the top spot.

A change at the top would not occur for a record period of 508 weeks (from 16 November 2009 to 19 August 2019), when Wales became the top ranked team for the first time after defeating England at Cardiff in a  World Cup 2019 warm-up test in August, following on a streak in which they won 15 of 16 tests, including a Six Nations Grand Slam. Two weeks later New Zealand returned to the top of the summit following Ireland's victory over Wales in Cardiff in a  World Cup 2019 warm-up test. However, on 7 September 2019, Ireland defeated Wales again, this time in Dublin, and they were installed as the number 1 team for the first time in their history, which they held entering the 2019 Rugby World Cup.

The first round of matches in the 2019 Rugby World Cup saw a further change at the top, with New Zealand's pool stage victory over the Springboks seeing them regain the top spot. England's defeat of New Zealand in the 2019 World Cup semi-finals saw them return to the top spot for the first time since 2004. A week later, South Africa reclaimed top spot after defeating England in the final.

2021 saw the ranking lead change several times with South Africa and New Zealand each holding the top spot at various points. In 2022, France replaced South Africa on top of the rankings following their victory over Japan in their summer tour and the Springboks' home defeat by a touring Wales team. A week later, Ireland claimed top spot following victory in their summer tour to New Zealand.

Since the rankings began, the winners of every edition of the World Cup have held the number 1 spot at the end of the tournament.

New Zealand have been the most consistently ranked #1 team since the introduction of the world rankings in 2003, having held the #1 ranking for 75% of the time during this period. South Africa is second with 20% of the time, with England, Wales, Ireland and France making up the remainder.

To date, 2019 is the only calendar year in which more than three nations have held the number 1 spot - with five nations holding that title at some point during the year.

Best and worst ranking positions 
Below is a list of the best and worst ranking positions for nations that have appeared in the Rugby World Cup:

Rating leaders 
According to World Rugby the "top side in the World will normally have a rating above 90", however, this is not always the case. New Zealand retained the number 1 position in August 2019 following defeat by Australia at Perth in the Rugby Championship, despite their ratings falling to 89.04. A week later, Wales increased their rating to 89.43 and claimed the top spot by beating England at Cardiff in a World Cup 2019 warm-up test. In contrast, some countries that have reached a rating of over 90 rating points, such as Australia (91.75) and Ireland (91.17), did not achieve the top spot, although Ireland would eventually reach the top of the summit with a rating of 89.47 following their victory over Wales in a World Cup 2019 warm-up test in Dublin, while Australia still to date have never attained the number 1 ranked position. This is due to the success of New Zealand who had been rated above 90 rating points for a record of 509 weeks and 6 days (from 2 November 2009 to 11 August 2019), which ended following the aforementioned defeat to Australia.

New Zealand also holds the record for the highest rating points amassed by any team, which currently stands at 96.57. England first held the record at 93.99 on the 24 November 2003, following their World Cup win in Australia; however, New Zealand surpassed this on 28 August 2006 with a rating of 94.62, following their Tri Nations victory over South Africa in Pretoria. The All Blacks would go on to push this record further over the years, reaching 95.01 points on the 25 June 2007 after beating South Africa in Durban, 96.10 points after their 2015 World Cup win in England and 96.30 points on 22 August 2016, following their Rugby Championship victory over Australia in Sydney, to its current record of 96.57, which they attained on 10 October 2016 after defeating South Africa in Durban. New Zealand's defeat by Ireland at Soldier Field, Chicago as part of the Autumn International Test Series in November 2016 ended their record streak.

Most and least accumulated ratings 
Below is a list of the most and least accumulated rating points for each of the nations that have appeared in the Rugby World Cup since the ranking tables were first published on the 13 October 2003:

List of rankings leader

Summary

Current calculation method
All World Rugby member countries have been given a rating that is in the range of 0 to 100 with the top side achieving a rating of about 90 points. The point system is calculated using a 'Points Exchange' system, in which sides receive points from each other on the basis of the match result – whatever one side gains, the other loses. The exchanges are based on the match result, the ranking of each team, and the margin of victory, with an allowance for home advantage. As the system aims to depict current team strengths, past successes or losses will fade and be superseded by more recent results. Thus, it is thought that it will produce an accurate picture depicting the actual current strength and thus rank of the nations. The rankings are responsive to results and it is possible to climb to the top from the bottom (and vice versa) in fewer than 20 matches. As all matches are worth a net of 0 points for the two teams combined, there is no particular advantage to playing more matches. A rating stays the same until the team plays again. Although matches often result in points exchanges, 'predictable' results lead to very minor changes, and may result in no change to either side's rating.

Rules
The system ensures that it is representative of the teams' performance despite playing differing numbers of matches each year, and the differing strength of opposition that teams have to face. The factors taken into account are as follows:
Match result
Match status
Opposition strength
Home advantage

Match result
For each match played points exchanges are awarded for the following five outcomes and was developed using results of international matches from 1871 to the present day: 
 a win or loss by more than 15 points
 a win or loss by up to 15 points
 a draw

Match status
Different matches have different importance to teams, and World Rugby has tried to reflect this by using a weighting system, where the most significant matches are in the Rugby World Cup Finals. Points exchanges are doubled during the World Cup Finals to recognise the unique importance of this event. All other full international matches are treated the same, to be as fair as possible to countries playing a different mix of friendly and competitive matches. Matches that do not have full international status do not count.

Opposition strength
A win against a very highly ranked opponent is a considerably greater achievement than a win against a low-rated opponent, so the strength of the opposing team is a factor. Thus match results are more important than margins of victory in producing accurate rankings. This is because when a highly ranked team plays a lowly ranked team and manages to beat them by over 50 points, it does not necessarily indicate how either team will perform in the future.

Home advantage 
When calculating points exchanges, the home side is handicapped by treating them as though they are three rating points better than their current rating. This results in the home side gaining fewer points for winning and losing more points for losing. Because of this, ideally, any advantage that a side may have by playing in front of their home crowd is cancelled out.

How to calculate the Points Exchange 

[1] Take the pre-match Points Ranking Score of Team Y.  
If Y has home advantage, add 3 to its pre-match Points Ranking Score.  
This is the “Modified pre-match Points Ranking Score” for Team Y. 
Call it “A”.

[2] Take the pre-match Points Ranking Score of Team Z.  
If Z has home advantage, add 3 to its pre-match Points Ranking Score.
This is the “Modified pre-match Points Ranking Score” for Team Z.
Call it “B”.

[3] Calculate the Difference between the two “Modified pre-match Points Ranking Scores”.  
Call it “D”.

[4] Apply the formula from the relevant item in this list:

World Cup Matches	

... Team Y wins by 16 or more points ............... 	(10+B-A) x 0.3	        capped at 6

... Team Y wins by 15 or fewer points ............... (10+B-A) x 0.2	        capped at 4
	
... The match is a draw [**see note 9] ...............	    D x 0.2	        capped at 2
	
... Team Z wins by 15 or fewer points ...............	(10+A-B) x 0.2	        capped at 4
	
... Team Z wins by 16 or more points ...............	(10+A-B) x 0.3	        capped at 6	

Other International

... Team Y wins by 16 or more points ...............	(10+B-A) x 0.15	        capped at 3

... Team Y wins by 15 or fewer points ...............	(10+B-A) x 0.1	        capped at 2

... The match is a draw [**see note 9] ...............	    D x 0.1	        capped at 1

... Team Z wins by 15 or fewer points ...............	(10+A-B) x 0.1	        capped at 2

... Team Z wins by 16 or more points ...............	(10+A-B) x 0.15	        capped at 3

[5] The team with the higher “Modified pre-match Points Ranking Score” may be termed the “Favourite”.

[6] The team with the lower “Modified pre-match Points Ranking Score” may be termed the “Underdog”.

[7] A team whose “Modified pre-match Points Ranking Score” is 10+ points lower than their opponents’ "Modified pre-match Points Ranking Score” may be termed the “Outsider”.

[8] An "Underdog" stands to gain more from a victory than does a "Favourite".

[9] In the case of a draw, the points are transferred from the “Favourite” to the “Underdog” or “Outsider”. The transfer is capped at 1 (2 in a World Cup Match).

[10] There is no transfer of points if a “Favourite” beats an “Outsider”.

New and dormant nations
All new member nations start with 30.00 points, which is provisional until they have completed ten test matches. When countries merge, the new country inherits the higher rating of the two countries but when they split e.g., the 2010 breakup of the Arabian Gulf rugby union team into separate teams representing its current member countries, the new countries will inherit a rating at a fixed level below the rating of the original country.

Before 1 December 2012 new member nations were given 40.00 points.

Countries that have not played a test for two years are removed from the ranking system and the list. If they become active again, they resume their previous rating.

***For a full explanation of how rankings are calculated, see the World Rugby rankings website.

Women's rankings

World Rugby also publishes rankings for women's teams.

References

External links 
 Official World Rankings
 Official World Rankings for Women's Teams

Rank
Sports world rankings